Rosemary Joan Owens AO was the Dean of Law at the University of Adelaide Law School. She first started working at the University of Adelaide in 1987 as a tutor in the law school, becoming a Senior Lecturer in 1995, Associate Professor in 2005, and in 2008 she was appointed as a Professor of Law. She had previously performed the role of Associate Dean and replaced Paul Fairall upon his departure in 2008, remaining in the role until 2011.

Rosemary Owens holds a Bachelor of Laws (Hons) with Honors (having been awarded both The Angus Parsons Prize and The Law Society of South Australia Centenary Prize), a Diploma of Education, and a Bachelor of Arts (Hons), majoring in history. All were awarded by the University of Adelaide. Her research interests include work-related law and feminist legal theory.

In 2014 she was named an Officer of the Order of Australia in recognition of her "distinguished service to the law, particularly to legal education as an academic and administrator, to national and international employment and labour organisations, and to women".

Selected bibliography

Related Pages
Adelaide University

References

External links
Profile from the University of Adelaide

Year of birth missing (living people)
Living people
Academic staff of the University of Adelaide
Law school deans
Women deans (academic)
Officers of the Order of Australia
Adelaide Law School alumni
Australian legal scholars
Australian university and college faculty deans
Australian women academics
Women legal scholars